The Living Room is a 1953 play by Graham Greene

Synopsis
The play consists of two acts, each of two scenes and is set entirely in the living room of Rose Pemberton and her two elderly aunts who live with the aunts' brother James, a disabled Roman Catholic priest. The aunts have a long-running fear of death in the house, with any bedroom being locked away from further use following a death of its resident family member. The story revolves around the introduction of Rose's new lover, Michael Dennis, to the family. It later transpires that Michael is married when his suicidal wife arrives at the house.

Premiere
After premiering at the Lyceum Theatre in Edinburgh it transferred to the West End where it ran for 308 performances at Wyndham's Theatre between 16 April 1953 and 9 January 1954.

Original cast
Mary, the daily woman – Dorothy Dewhurst
Michael Dennis – John Robinson
Rose Pemberton – Dorothy Tutin
Miss Teresa Browne – Mary Jerrold
Miss Helen Browne – Violet Farebrother
Father James Browne – Eric Portman
Mrs Dennis –  Valerie Taylor

Broadway
A Broadway production followed in November 1954 at Henry Miller's Theatre, where it ran for just 22 performances.

Broadway cast
Mary, the daily woman – Hazel Jones
Michael Dennis – Michael Goodliffe
Rose Pemberton – Barbara Bel Geddes
Miss Teresa Browne – Nora Nicholson
Miss Helen Browne – Ann Shoemaker
Father James Browne – Walter Fitzgerald
Mrs Dennis –  Carol Goodner

Critical reception
The Sunday Express found the drama's central relationship "basically revolting," though concluded that the play would run and run, "because nothing is so appealing to a British audience as sex with an odour of sanctity and the glow of highbrowism"; whereas despite reservations, Kenneth Tynan called it "the best first play of its generation." The New York Times however, noted "a literate and rather bloodless drama...Although dramatic form often eludes novelists who are used to more time and space, Mr. Greene has made the transition competently."

Revivals
The Living Room was revived at the Jermyn Street Theatre in March 2013, with a cast including Christopher Timothy and Tuppence Middleton.

References

Bibliography
 Wearing, J.P. The London Stage 1950–1959: A Calendar of Productions, Performers, and Personnel.  Rowman & Littlefield, 2014.

External links
 

1953 plays
Plays by Graham Greene
West End plays